Medical education in Panama is principally offered and developed by accredited and government recognized medical schools in the country.  There are 5 medical schools in Panama, typically offering the Bachelor of Medicine and Surgery degrees.
In Panama medical programs are divided into two types: undergraduate entry and graduate entry.

Entrance
Undergraduate entry degrees are typically 6 years in duration and commonly tend to draw students entering directly from high school; while graduate entry degrees are typically 4 years in length, and draw a university graduate with a current 4 years Bachelor's degree required for entry.  These entries provide the medical programs with a variety in the age range and academic backgrounds of the participants.
It is important to note, however, that the graduate entry program still confers a bachelor's degree in Medicine; that although it is a graduate entry program, it does not confer a postgraduate degree in itself.

Requirements
In order to practice medicine in the Republic, or enter a residency program in Panama it is required to be Panamenian citizen.

Other requirements include:
First year rotatory Internship: Qualified medical practitioners must successfully undertake and complete one year of supervised practice, generally known as an internship. Internship is undertaken in hospital positions accredited for this purpose.
2 year rural Internship: Upon successful conclusion of the first intern year, doctors are required to undertake and complete a second year of internship at an assigned government health institution.  Once this requirement is fulfilled the medical practitioners qualify for a full registration in the Medical Board and are licensed to engage in independent medical practice in Panama

Medical universities

Universities with undergraduate entry medical programs only:

Universidad de Panama
Columbus University
Universidad Latina de Panama 
Universidad Latinoamericana de Ciencia y Tecnología ULACIT 
Universidad Autónoma de Chiriquí UNACHI, The only one university, outside of Panama City, which offers a complete medical program. This university is located in David, Chiriqui.

Universities with graduate entry medical programs only:

International School of Medical Sciences ISMS 

All the graduate entry programs share a similar application process at this time and comparable to the requirements in the United States. Candidates are first required to have a Premedical Degree in an approved University. A 4-year bachelor's degree is required.

References

External links
http://www.up.ac.pa/ftp/f_medicina/Educ.Medica%20Cont/EDUCACION%20MEDICA%20CONTINUA.PDF
https://web.archive.org/web/20110716162316/http://www.sumaclick.com/owens/relacion-de-la-educacion-medica-de-posgrado-y-la-planificacion-nacional-de-salud-en-america-latina-3/
http://apmf.wordpress.com/2007/06/14/la-medicina-familiar-en-panama/
http://www.gacetaoficial.gob.pa/pdfTemp/26105/11898.pdf
http://www.coneaupa.edu.pa/page_ley30

Education in Panama
Healthcare in Panama